Paul Frederick Ramage (born 13 March 1940) is a former English first-class cricketer and headmaster.
  
Ramage was born in Leamington Spa, Warwickshire, and attended Warwick School.

A left-handed batsman who bowled slow left-arm orthodox, he made his first-class debut for Cambridge University against Somerset in 1962.  He made 12 further first-class appearances for the university, the last of which came against Nottinghamshire in 1963.  In his 13 first-class matches, he scored 252 runs at an average of 16.80, with a high score of 50.  This score, his only first-class half century, came against the Free Foresters in 1962.  With the ball, he took 17 wickets at a bowling average of 36.05, with best figures of 4 for 65 against Combined Services in 1962.

He later made his debut for Buckinghamshire in the 1970 Minor Counties Championship against Berkshire.  Ramage played Minor counties cricket for Buckinghamshire from 1970 to 1972, which included 8 Minor Counties Championship appearances.

He became a schoolteacher. In 1967 he was master-in-charge of cricket at University College School in London. He was headmaster of The Hall School, Hampstead, from 1993 to 2003 and from 2005 to 2006.

References

External links
Paul Ramage at ESPNcricinfo
Paul Ramage at CricketArchive

1940 births
Living people
Sportspeople from Leamington Spa
People educated at Warwick School
Alumni of the University of Cambridge
English cricketers
Cambridge University cricketers
Buckinghamshire cricketers
Schoolteachers from Warwickshire